Cyclophora ariadne is a moth in the family Geometridae first described by Reisser in 1939. It is found on Crete.

The wingspan is 18–26 mm. The ground colour is ochreous yellow.

The larvae feed on Platanus orientalis.

References

Moths described in 1939
Cyclophora (moth)
Moths of Europe